Glenwood is an unincorporated community in Lane County, Oregon, United States. Located between the cities of Springfield and Eugene, on the route of the former Pacific Highway, which is now named Franklin Boulevard. Glenwood is in Springfield's annexation and has a Eugene postal address.

History
In the past, Glenwood was an agricultural area with bean fields and fruit tree orchards. The town has a significant amount of real estate properties located on the Willamette River.

Transportation

Bus
The Emerald Express (EmX) is an express bus rapid transit (BRT) bus service that runs between Eugene and Springfield, and has three stops in Glenwood. On weekdays, bus service runs from approximately from 6:00am to 11:00pm, with lesser stops during weekends.

References

External links 
 October 8, 2006 Register-Guard story about Glenwood
 June 13, 2002 Eugene Weekly cover story about Glenwood

Unincorporated communities in Lane County, Oregon
Unincorporated communities in Oregon